The National Negro Business League (NNBL) was an American organization founded in Boston in 1900 by Booker T. Washington to promote the interests of African-American businesses. The mission and main goal of the National Negro Business League was "to promote the commercial and financial development of the Negro." It was recognized as "composed of negro men and women who have achieved success along business lines".   It grew rapidly with 320 chapters in 1905 and more than 600 chapters in 34 states in 1915.

In 1966, the League was renamed and reincorporated in Washington D.C. as the National Business League, which remains in operation.

History

Establishment
The National Negro Business League (NNBL) was established in Boston, Massachusetts in 1900 by Booker T. Washington. The effort was supported by industrialist and philanthropist Andrew Carnegie.

The organization was formally incorporated in 1901 in New York , and established 320 chapters across the United States. In May 1913, a respected Black journalist, Ralph Waldo Tyler was elected as the first National Organizer of the NNBL. Tyler's role was to travel throughout the Southern United States and document the state of negro businesses and encourage enrollment in the NNBL.

The League included Negro small- business owners, doctors, farmers, other professionals, craftsmen, etc. Its goal was to allow business to put economic development at the forefront of getting African-American equality in the United States.  Business was the main concern, but civil rights came next. In 1905 the Nashville, Tennessee, chapter protested segregation in local transit with a boycott. Booker T. Washington felt that there was a need for African Americans to build an economic network and allow that to be a catalyst for change and social improvement. Also, extant press releases indicate that "the League organized the National Negro Business Service to 'help . . the Negro business men of the country solve their merchandising and advertising problems,' promoted advertising in Negro newspapers and magazines, and 'influenced . . . national advertisers to use Negro publications in reaching this importantly valuable group of people with its tremendous purchasing power.'"

After the death of Booker T. Washington in 1915, the League was headed by his successor at Tuskegee, Robert Russa Moton. Albon L. Holsey, an executive at Tuskegee, was executive secretary of the League. Other leaders in 1922-23 were John L. Webb, treasurer (succeeding Charles H. Anderson), and Charles Clinton Spaulding, head of the North Carolina Mutual Life Insurance Co. in Durham, North Carolina.

Affiliations
Affiliated professional organizations included: the National Negro Bankers Association, the National Negro Press Association, the National Association of Negro Funeral Directors, the National Negro Bar Association, the National Association of Negro Insurance Men, the National Negro Retail Merchants' Association, the National Association of Negro Real Estate Dealers, and the National Negro Finance Corporation. The National Negro Bankers Association was organized at a meeting of the League in 1906 by Birmingham's William R. Pettiford.

The organization inspired Robert R. Church Sr. to open Solvent Savings Bank in Memphis, Tennessee in 1906.

See also
 Civil rights movement (1896–1954)
 American business history
 African American business history

Footnotes

Further reading
  Burrows, John H. The Necessity of Myth: A History of the National Negro Business League, 1900–1945 (Auburn, AL: Hickory Hill Press, 1988).
 Harlan, Louis R. "Booker T. Washington and the National Negro Business League" in Raymond W. Smock, ed. Booker T. Washington in Perspective: Essays of Louis R. Harlan (1988) pp. 98–109. online
 
 Verney, Kevern J. The Art of the Possible: Booker T. Washington and Black Leadership in the United States, 1881-1925. New York: Routledge, 2002.

Primary sources
 Kenneth Hamilton (ed.), A Guide to the Records of the National Negro Business League. Bethesda, MD: University Publications of America, 1995.
 National Negro Business League, Proceedings of the National Negro Business League: Its First Meeting, Held in Boston, Massachusetts, August 23 and 24, 1900. Boston: J.E. Hamm, Publisher, 1901.

External links

National Business League website
 Joseph Bernardo, "National Negro Business League (1900 - )," Black Past
 Library of Congress, "National Negro Business League," American Memory, www.memory.loc.gov/
 Richard Wormer, "National Negro Business League," The Rise and Fall of Jim Crow: Jim Crow Stories, PBS

Organizations established in 1900
1900 establishments in the United States
African-American professional organizations
African Americans' rights organizations
Business organizations based in the United States
Organizations based in Washington, D.C.
African-American businesspeople
American businesspeople